Mumtaz Ahmed Khan is Indian Politician and Former Member of 12th Jammu and Kashmir Legislative Assembly. Khan was previously associated with Indian National Congress but left the party and joined Jammu and Kashmir Apni Party. Khan contest from Gulabgarh constituency earlier his father was used to contest from Gulabgarh. Khan’s father was Haji Buland Khan, who was a three-time member of the Jammu and Kashmir Legislative Assembly. Mumtaz' elder brother is Ajaz Ahmed Khan who was a former Minister and three-time member of the Jammu and Kashmir Legislative Assembly.

References 

Jammu and Kashmir MLAs 2014–2018

1975 births

Living people